Cheorwon County (Cheorwon-gun ), also spelled Chorwon, is a county in Gangwon Province, South Korea. It is located right next to the border with North Korea.

History
Goguryeo - First named Moeuldongbi.
Silla Dynasty - name changed to Cheolseong.
During the Later Three Kingdoms Period of Korea, Gung Ye determined it capital of Taebong.
Goryeo Dynasty
In 918, during the rule of King Taejo of Goryeo, its name was changed to Cheorwon and then renamed as Dongju.
Joseon Dynasty
King Taejong changed its name into 'Dohobu'.
In 26th year of King Sejong's reign (1434), it was transferred from Gyeonggi-do to Gangwon.
On May 26 of the King Gojong, altered to Chuncheon-bu.

Korean War
Following the Division of Korea in 1945, all of Cheorwon County was part of North Korea.

During the Korean War the region changed hands several times during the UN invasion of North Korea and the Chinese invasion of South Korea, by 1951 the frontlines had stabilized, cutting across Cheorwon County and the area became part of the Iron Triangle battlefield. The Battle of White Horse took place north of Cheorwon town from 6–15 October 1952 and the Battle of Triangle Hill took place north of Gimhwa-eup from 14 October - 25 November 1952.

Following the signing of the Korean Armistice Agreement, the Korean Demilitarized Zone cut Cheorwon County in two, creating Cheorwon County in South Korea and Chorwon County in North Korea.
 
A number of Korean War sites in Cheorwon County are now tourist destinations including the former Woljeong-ri station, the former Korean Workers’ Party Office, the Iron Triangle Tourist Office, the Second Incursion Tunnel and the Cheorwon Peace Observatory.

Civilian Control Line (CCL) 
The Civilian Control Line is an additional buffer zone to the Demilitarized Zone (DMZ).  The distance between the DMZ and CCL in South Korea range from 5 to 20 km (3.1 to 12.4 mi). The purpose is to limit and control the entrance of civilians into areas in order to protect and maintain the security of military facilities and operations near the DMZ.

Tourism 

For South Korea, tourism has been important since the 1962 Five Year Development Plan.  This designated a key economic development sector and a ‘patriotic industry’ (Hunter, 153). Historically nationalistic or patriotic views have driven for the development of tourism in South Korea.  Well organized tours and defined monuments and sites ensure these bordering areas are populated with visitors that participate in the symbolic landscape defined by the South Korean government (Hunter, 153).

“A scene of bloody battles” (n.d) and tense border activity, the front line county of Cheorwon, is a strange paradox.  This historical county is a strange paradox which is rarely visited by Western tourists. To comprehend the bloody and grim historical tragedy between North and South Korea, Cheorwon county must be experienced.

The Second Tunnel 
“Found in the DMZ” (n.d) was found by Korean guards listening to the sound of explosions under the ground during their shift. After determined excavation on March 19, 1975, “The Second Tunnel” was discovered. The second tunnel was for a sudden raid by the North Korean Army into South Korea.  The second tunnel is composed of a firm granitic layer, is 3.5 km (2.17 mi) in length, and various in depth from 50m-160m (164 ft-525 ft).

Cheorwon Peace Observatory 
“Cheorwon Peace Observatory” (n.d) is located at Junggang-ri, Dongsong-eup, South Korea.  The Observatory is three stories high with a basement and was opened in November 2007.  The observatory's first floor is the exhibition hall and the second floor is an observatory. Tourists on the second floor can observe the surrounding ecosystem, fortress of Gung-Ye Cast town, Pyeonggang tableland, and Seonjeon town of North Korea in the DMZ.

Memorial Tower of the Baekma Goji (White Horse) Battle 
During ten days of battle, the hill would change hands 24 times after repeated attacks and counterattacks for its possession The original shape of the hill was transformed from more than 300,000 artillery shells and bombs. The destroyed ridge looked like a white horse lying down, so it was named Baekma Goji, meaning white horse hill.

Victory Observatory 
“At the center of the 155 miles” (n.d) of the cease-fire line is the Victory Observatory. While visiting the Victory Observatory tourists can stare at Soldiers from the North Korean army, and the actual sites of the national division such as Geumgansan Railroad, Gwangasm Plain, and Achim-ri town.

Symbols
 County Tree : Korean Nut Pine
 County Flower : Royal Azalea
 County Bird : Crane

Location
Cheorwon plays an important role in providing passage from Seoul to Wonsan and Kumgangsan.

Since the expansion of the 43 National Road which connects Cheorwon and Seoul, the ease of transportation has been improved greatly.

Climate
Cheorwon has a monsoon-influenced humid continental climate (Köppen: Dwa).

Sister cities
Gangnam-gu, Seoul
Seogwipo, Jeju-do

See also
Administrative divisions of South Korea
Chorwon County, North Korea
Geography of South Korea

References
Notes

Sources
Cheorwon Peace Observatory. (n.d.). Retrieved December 7, 2018
Cheorwon: Frontline Tourism. (November 5, 2015). Retrieved December 7, 2018
Hunter, W. C. (2013). The Visual Representation of Border Tourism: Demilitarized Zone (DMZ) and Dokdo in South Korea. International Journal of Tourism Research,17(2), 151–160. doi:10.1002/jtr.1973
Memorial Tower of the Baeckma Goji Battle. (n.d.). Retrieved December 9, 2018
The Second Tunnel. (n.d.). Retrieved December 8, 2018
Victory Observatory. (n.d.). Retrieved December 9, 2018

External links
Cheorwon county government home page

 
Counties of Gangwon Province, South Korea
Biosphere reserves of South Korea